Class enemy is a categorization used by the Soviet Union, particularly Stalin to imprison millions of Soviet citizens.

Class enemy may also refer to:

 Class Enemy (play), 1978 play
 Class Enemy (film), 2013 film